The Gabriel René Moreno Autonomous University (Spanish: Universidad Autónoma Gabriel René Moreno) is a university in Santa Cruz de la Sierra, Bolivia. It was created by supreme decree of December 15, 1879. The first rector was Bishop Juan Jose Valdivia, and the first university careers offered were Medicine, Theology, and Law.

The university is named after thinker, historian, and literary figure Gabriel René Moreno, called the "Prince of the Letters".

The university is the fifth-best university in Bolivia, as of 2023, and is first in academic quality in the department of Santa Cruz.

Faculties
The university currently has 18 faculties, 6 of which are located off the main urban campus.

Main Campus 

 Faculty of Legal, Political and Social Sciences.
 Faculty of Economic, Administrative and Financial Sciences
 Faculty of Agricultural Sciences
 Faculty of Exact Sciences and Technology
 Faculty of Veterinary Sciences
 School of Public Accounting
 Polytechnic School
 Faculty of Humanities
 Faculty of Engineering in Computer Science and Telecommunications
 Faculty of Habitat, Design and Art Sciences
 Faculty of Human Health Sciences
 Faculty of Pharmaceutical and Biochemical Sciences

Other Faculties 

 Integral Faculty of the Cruceño Valleys
 Integral Faculty of the Chaco
 Integral Faculty of the Chiquitania
 Integral Faculty of the North
 Integral Faculty of the NorthWest
 Integral Faculty of Ichilo

Culture 
The university has different places to carry out cultural events such as museums and a university theater.

Museums 

 Museum of History and Historical Archive
 Museum of Natural History "Noel Kempff Mercado"

Theater 

 University Auditorium "Dr. Humberto Parada Caro "

Research Institutes and Research Centers 
The university currently has several institutes, centers and observatories for research, supervised by the University Directorate of Research (Dirección Universitaria de Investigación).

Research Institutes 

 Institute of Technological Research
 Research Institute of the Faculty of Agricultural Sciences
 Institute of Economic and Social Research (IIES)
 Research Institute of the Faculty of Pharmaceutical and Biochemical Sciences
 Forest Research Institute (INIF)
 Bolivian Soy Institute
 Research Institute of the Faculty of Humanities
 Research Institute of the Faculty of Engineering in Computer Sciences and Telecommunications (IICCT)
 Research Institute "Monica Von Borries"
 Research Institute of the Habitat Sciences Faculty

Research Centers 

 Geo Cartography and Cadastre Research Center
 Food Technology Research and Development Center
 Center for Research and Business Development
 Center for Research and Management of Renewable Natural Resources
 Social Research Center for Development Support
 Center for Agricultural Research and Practice "Guirarapu"
Diabetes Care and Prevention Center "Cardenal Julio Terrazas"

Observatories 

 National Political Observatory (UAGRM)
 Observatory of the Environment
 Economic Observatory
 Children and Youth Observatory

References

Educational institutions established in 1880
Buildings and structures in Santa Cruz de la Sierra
Universities in Bolivia
1880 establishments in Bolivia
Buildings and structures in Santa Cruz Department (Bolivia)